Carlo Rossi (born 28 October 1955) is an Italian former racing driver.

Complete European Formula Two Championship results
(key) (Races in bold indicate pole position; races in italics indicate fastest lap)

References

1955 births
Living people
Italian racing drivers
European Formula Two Championship drivers
FIA European Formula 3 Championship drivers
24 Hours of Spa drivers

Alan Docking Racing drivers